Kowa may refer to:

 KOWA-LP, an defunct independent, non-commercial radio station in Olympia, Washington, USA
 Kōwa (Heian period) (康和), a Japanese era name for years spanning 1099 to 1103
 Kōwa (Muromachi period) (弘和), a Japanese era name for years spanning 1381 through 1383
 Kōwa, Japanese pronunciation for ancient Chinese emperors' era names
 光和, era name of Emperor Ling of Han from 178 to 184
 興和, era name of Emperor Xiaojing of Eastern Wei from 539 to 542
 , a train station in Mihama, Aichi, Japan
 Mount Kowa, Pacaraima Mountains, Guyana
 Kowa, a Japanese company working in a variety of industries including pharmaceuticals, chemicals, textiles, real estate, and optics

See also
 Cowa!, a manga by Akira Toriyama